Stefan Weisman (born 1970) is an American composer of contemporary classical music. He composes opera, chamber music, orchestral music, as well as music for the theater, video and dance.

Raised in East Brunswick, New Jersey, Weisman credits his passion for music starting with his participation in the orchestra at East Brunswick High School.

His opera Darkling, with a libretto by Anna Rabinowitz was commissioned, developed and produced in 2006 by American Opera Projects. Elements of composer Lee Hoiby’s song “The Darkling Thrush” were used as source material for the opera's music. Darkling was included in the Guggenheim Museum's "Works & Process" series, and premiered at the East 13th Street Theater. In a New York Times review, Anthony Tommasini described Weisman's music as "personal, moody and skillfully wrought." Darkling was released internationally by Albany Records in 2011. Of the CD, Gramophone Magazine wrote: “Weisman unfolds his emotional tapestry with confident strokes…resulting in something resembling a high-art radio drama.”

Weisman's opera Fade, with a libretto by David Cote, was commissioned and produced in 2008 by Second Movement Opera.

Weisman was a resident artist at the HERE Arts Center, where he developed an opera with Cote, based on the short story "The Scarlet Ibis" by author James Hurst. With Cote, he is creating an opera, American Atheist, about the life and violent death of Madalyn Murray O'Hair.

He was a recipient of a 2007 commission from Bang on a Can, and his music has also been performed by the Miró Quartet, Lisa Moore, Anthony Roth Costanzo, and Newspeak. He wrote the music for the play Calabi-Yau. In 2012, when his song "Twinkie" was featured on the nationally syndicated program The Wendy Williams Show, the host said, "Very unique...You're not going to hear opera like this anywhere else...Fabulous!"

He studied composition at Bard College with Joan Tower and Daron Hagen, and at Yale University with David Lang, Jacob Druckman, Ezra Laderman and Martin Bresnick.  He earned a Ph.D. from Princeton University in 2011, where he studied composition with Paul Lansky, Steven Mackey and Barbara White.

Presently, he is a music instructor at Bard High School Early College in Queens, NY. He has also taught at the Princeton University Department of Music, and  Juilliard School’s Music Advancement Program, and the City College of New York.

Recordings

2012: "Stefan Weisman: Darkling"  Albany Records

2012: "Newspeak: Sweet Light Crude"  New Amsterdam Records
  Includes Stefan Weisman: I Would Prefer Not To

2011: "Jody Redhage: of minutiae & memory"  New Amsterdam Records
  Includes Stefan Weisman: Everywhere Feathers

References

External links
Stefan Weisman official website
Darkling opera
Fade opera
The Scarlet Ibis opera
American Atheist opera

1970 births
20th-century American composers
20th-century American Jews
20th-century American male musicians
20th-century classical composers
21st-century American composers
21st-century American Jews
21st-century American male musicians
21st-century classical composers
American classical composers
American contemporary classical composers
American male classical composers
American opera composers
Classical musicians from New Jersey
East Brunswick High School alumni
Jewish American classical composers
Jewish opera composers
Living people
Male opera composers
People from East Brunswick, New Jersey
Princeton University alumni
Yale University alumni